The 1984 Bowling Green Falcons football team was an American football team that represented Bowling Green University in the Mid-American Conference (MAC) during the 1984 NCAA Division I-A football season. In their eighth season under head coach Denny Stolz, the Falcons compiled an 8–3 record (7–2 against MAC opponents), finished in second place in the MAC, and outscored their opponents by a combined total of 327 to 198.

The team's statistical leaders included Brian McClure with 2,951 passing yards, Bernard White with 1,036 rushing yards, and Stan Hunter with 744 receiving yards.

Schedule

References

Bowling Green
Bowling Green Falcons football seasons
Bowling Green Falcons football